William Phillips (4 September 1943 – 26 July 2022) was an Australian water polo player. He competed in the men's tournament at the 1964 Summer Olympics.

References

External links

1943 births
2022 deaths
Australian male water polo players
Olympic water polo players of Australia
Water polo players at the 1964 Summer Olympics
Sportsmen from New South Wales
People from Manly, New South Wales
20th-century Australian people